Nora Kelly may refer to:
 Nora Kelly (writer) (born 1945), American-born Canadian mystery writer
Nora Kelly (journalist), New Zealand-born Australian journalist, poet and playwright, who wrote as Nora McAuliffe
 Jane Toppan (1857–1938), born Honora Kelley, American serial killer